Stephens County is the name of three counties in the United States of America:

Stephens County, Georgia 
Stephens County, Oklahoma 
Stephens County, Texas

See also
Stevens County (disambiguation)